Hunter is a 1977 American dramatic television series starring James Franciscus and Linda Evans which centered on the exploits of a pair of undercover counterespionage agents. It aired from February 18 to May 27, 1977, on CBS.

Cast

 James Franciscus...James Hunter
 Linda Evans...Marty Shaw
 Ralph Bellamy...General Baker

Synopsis

James Hunter worked for an unnamed United States government intelligence agency – referred to merely as "the Agency" – until 1969, when he resigned because he disapproved of the Agencys methods. He retired from the espionage business to run a rare books store in Santa Barbara, California. In 1977, General Baker is ordered to recruit six counterespionage agents to form a new covert agency – also unnamed – charged with protecting the United States from a variety of threats whether they arise domestically or abroad. Bakers first choice for the new agency is Hunter. In Bakers new agency, Hunter either works alone or is assigned someone to assist him, all the while continuing to pose as a rare books dealer.

In all but two episodes, Baker assigns another of his agents, Marty Shaw, to assist Hunter. Marty lives in a different part of the United States and is also undercover – as a famous model. She also has her own assignments separate from Hunters. Marty is Hunters lover, and the two share a bed when traveling together on their assignments.

As undercover counterespionage agents, they battle in locales across the United States with a wide variety of international foes, ranging from communists to organized crime to rogue American agents.

The two "K Group" episodes differ from the rest in being flashbacks to the time when Hunter was still with "the Agency" as its chief of operations in West Berlin.

Production

CBS picked up Hunter in 1976 as a hedge against one of its new shows failing during the 1976–77 season. In the pilot for the show, produced in 1976, James Franciscus was the shows only regular and his James Hunter character was a man framed for crimes he did not commit. Released after eight years in prison, he sets out to clear his name by bringing Ingersoll, the man who framed him, to justice. Along the way he meets and falls for a prostitute, Marty Shaw, portrayed by guest star Linda Evans. Ingersoll evades capture, and the show's producers envisioned that in future episodes Hunter would continue his pursuit of Ingersoll.

The pilot never aired, and its entire premise was scrapped. For the weekly series, James Hunter instead became the retired agent who resumes a counterespionage career. Franciscus and Evans had had a good on-screen chemistry in the pilot, so Marty became a regular character as a fellow agent and model instead of a prostitute. The General Baker character also was introduced as their spymaster. Thirteen episodes were produced with this new premise.

William Blinn created Hunter and wrote its pilot, and David Gerber (at the time president of competing studio Columbia Pictures Television) was the shows executive producer for Lorimar Productions. Lee Rich and Philip Capice produced the pilot and the weekly series. Tom Gries produced and directed the pilot and Christopher Morgan produced the weekly series.

Broadcast history

After the cancellation of the series Executive Suite and its last broadcast on February 11, 1977, CBS needed a replacement to fill the void in its schedule. It had bought Hunter for just such a contingency. Hunter premiered a week later, on February 18, 1977, and aired on Fridays at 10:00 p.m. through April 22, 1977. After a five-week hiatus, its last original episode was broadcast on Friday, May 27, 1977, also at 10:00 p.m. Four additional episodes never aired.

Episodes

Sources

References

External links
Opening credits for Hunter (in French) on YouTube

CBS original programming
1977 American television series debuts
1977 American television series endings
1970s American drama television series
Espionage television series
English-language television shows
Television series by Lorimar Television
Television shows set in Chicago